The National Archives Administration of China is the national administrative agency responsible for historical records of the state dating back to imperial times in China. The archive collections include more than 800,000 records. There are more than 80 million items of information in documents, records, files,  manuscripts on important political figures. The agency also concurrently holds records for the Central Committee of the Chinese Communist Party. Hence it is also known as the Central Archives.

History 
The National Archives Agency was established in November 1954, as a national agency subordinated to the State Council of the People's Republic of China. In 1959, CCP Central Committee decided the National Archives was not just an archive agency for the communist party and it should be also a state agency for repository of state official records.

In 1970, the National Archives was made defunct. In 1979, the National Archives was reestablished. In 1985, the CCP Central Committee and State Council decided to change the National Archives owned by the State Council of the People's Republic of China leadership to manage all the archival work of the State Council executive government departments, all subordinated agencies administered by or reporting to the State Council.

Central Archives agency was established separately in June 1959 by the CCP Central Committee to archive important documents for the party central committee and the central authorities.

In 1993, the National Archives and Central Archives agency were merged into one unified agency called the State Archives Administration operating two archives, one for the state and one for the ruling political party.

Subordinate archives 
 First Historical Archives of China in Beijing, holds document of the Ming and Qing dynasties.
 Second Historical Archives of China in Nanjing, holds document of the Republic of China (1912–1949), including both Beijing (Beiyang) and Nanjing (Kuomintang) governments.

Administration

The agency is structured in the following departments.

Internal units 
Office
Archival storage Department
Archival Use Department
Finance Department
Policies and regulations Research Department
Foreign Affairs Office
Information Management Centre

Affiliations
 China Archives Newspaper
 China Archives Press
 Archives of Science and Technology Institute
 Archival cadres and Education Centre
 Chinese Archives magazine

Secretary for the National Archives
Zeng San (1954.11 - 1966.11)
Yang Qing (1966.07 - 1967.01)
Zhang Zhong (1979.06 - 1983.01)
Han Yuhu (1983.02 - 1988.11)
Feng Zizhi (1988.11 - 1994.01)
Wang Gang (1994.01 - 2000.01)
Mao Fumin (2000.01 - 2006.07)
Yang Dongquan (2006.07 - 2015.08)
Li Minghua (2015.08 - 2020.06)
Lu Guoqiang (2020.06 - present)

Curator of the Central Archives
Zeng San (1959.06 - 1966)
Xiao Guang (1970.01 - 1979.06, curator of the CCP Central Committee archives)
Zeng San (1979.06 – 1982.02)
Wang Mingzhe (1982.02 - 1993.12)
Wang Gang (1993.12 - 1999.12)
Mao Fumin (1999.12 - 2006.07)
Yang Dongquan (2006.07 - 2015.07)
Li Minghua (2015.07 - 2020.05)
Lu Guoqiang (2020.05 - present)

See also 
 List of national archives

References

External links 
  

China
1954 establishments in China
Government agencies of China
Government agencies established in 1954
Organizations based in Beijing
Archives in China